The 1901 Federal Flag Design Competition was an Australian government initiative announced by Prime Minister Edmund Barton to find a flag for the newly federated Commonwealth of Australia. In terms of its essential elements the winning entries are the official flag of Australia.

Background
After Federation on 1 January 1901 and following receipt of a request from the British government to design a flag to distinguish Australia, the new Commonwealth Government held an official competition for a new 'federal flag' in April. The competition attracted 32,823 entries, including those originally sent to the one held earlier by the Review of Reviews. One of these was submitted by an unnamed governor of a colony. The two contests were merged after the Review of Reviews agreed to being integrated into the government initiative. The £75 prize money of each competition were combined and augmented by a further £50 donated by Havelock Tobacco Company.

Conditions
Each competitor was required to submit two coloured sketches, a red ensign for the merchant service and public use, and a blue ensign for naval and official use. The designs were judged on seven criteria: loyalty to the Empire, Federation, history, heraldry, distinctiveness, utility and cost of manufacture. The majority of designs incorporated the Union Flag and the Southern Cross, but native animals were also popular, including one that depicted a variety of indigenous animals playing cricket. The entries were put on display at the Royal Exhibition Building in Melbourne and the judges took six days to deliberate before reaching their conclusion.

Winners
Five almost identical entries were chosen as the winning design, and their designers shared the £200 (2015: $29,142.12) prize money. They were Ivor Evans, a fourteen-year-old schoolboy from Melbourne; Leslie John Hawkins, a teenager apprenticed to an optician from Sydney; Egbert John Nuttall, an architect from Melbourne; Annie Dorrington, an artist from Perth; and William Stevens, a ship's officer from Auckland, New Zealand. The five winners received £40 each. The differences from the present flag were the six-pointed Commonwealth Star, while the components stars in the Southern Cross had different numbers of points, with more if the real star was brighter. This led to five stars of nine, eight, seven, six and five points respectively.

Aftermath
A simplified version of the competition-winning design was submitted to the British admiralty for entry into their register of flags in December 1901.  Prime Minister Edmund Barton announced in the Commonwealth Gazette that Edward VII had officially recognised the design as the Flag of Australia on 11 February 1903. This version made all the stars in the Southern Cross seven-pointed apart from the smallest, and is the same as the existing flag except the six-pointed Commonwealth Star.

Misconceptions
There were five judges for the competition and not seven. This misunderstanding seems to have arisen from the Review of Reviews listing the seven names of the competition's "judges and officials" The Review of Reviews gives the names of the five judges in the 20 August 1901 edition, and subsequently confirms that number on 20 September 1901. Mr J.S. Blackham, chief of staff of the Melbourne Herald, was the competition official "who superintended the classification and arrangement of the flags" for "when they were shown in Melbourne's Exhibition Building"; Mr G. Stewart was another competition official described by Frank Cayley as "an expert in heraldry".

Several secondary sources have claimed the conditions stated the design should "be based on the British ensigns ... signalling to the beholder that it is an Imperial union ensign of the British Empire" and around the Southern Cross. In fact there was no such stipulation made either by the Reviews of Reviews, which had received the majority of the entries, or the federal government (although contestants in the Review of Reviews contest were advised that "A flag, perhaps, which omitted these symbols might have small chances of success; yet it seems unwise to fetter the competition with any such absolute limitations"). This error stems from Gwen Swinburne's 1969 book, Unfurled: Australia's Flag, in which she incorrectly attributes the above quote as a condition for the 1901 Federal Flag Competition. She had apparently used a passage from Barlow Cumberland's 1909 book, History of the Union Jack and the Flag of the Empire, as the basis of her quote.

References

External links
Digitised copy of Review of Reviews for Australasia, 20 September 1901

Flags of Australia
1901 in Australia
Arts competitions
Competitions in Australia